Glyphodes stolalis is a moth in the family Crambidae. It was described by Achille Guenée in 1854. It is found in Cameroon, the Comoros, the Democratic Republic of the Congo (Equateur, Orientale, North Kivu), Kenya, Réunion, Madagascar, the Seychelles (Félicité, Denis, Silhouette, Round, Sainte-Marie, Mahé, Long), South Africa (KwaZulu-Natal), the Gambia, Uganda, Zimbabwe, China, India, Indonesia (Sulawesi), Sri Lanka, Japan, Taiwan, Thailand and Australia (Western Australia, Queensland).

The wingspan is about 30 mm. The wings are pale brown with white and purple patches outlined in dark brown.

References

stolalis
Moths of Africa
Moths of Asia
Insects of Southeast Asia
Moths described in 1854
Taxa named by Achille Guenée